Verkehrsverbund Rhein-Ruhr is a public transport association in Germany.

VRR may also refer to:
 VRR (program), a vector graphics editor
 Variable refresh rate, displays that support a dynamic refresh rate
 Vehicular Reactive Routing protocol
 Voters Registration Record, a process of voter registration in the Philippines